The 1987 CA-TennisTrophy was a men's tennis tournament played on indoor carpet courts at the Wiener Stadthalle in Vienna, Austria that was part of the 1987 Nabisco Grand Prix. It was the 13th edition of the tournament and took place from 19 October until 26 October 1987. Jonas Svensson won the singles title.

Finals

Singles

 Jonas Svensson defeated  Amos Mansdorf, 1–6, 1–6, 6–2, 6–3, 7–5
 It was Svensson's 2nd title of the year and the 3rd of his career.

Doubles

 Mel Purcell /  Tim Wilkison defeated  Emilio Sánchez /  Javier Sánchez, 6–3, 7–5
 It was Purcell's only title of the year and the 7th of his career. It was Wilkison's only title of the year and the 12th of his career.

References

External links
 ATP tournament profile
 ITF tournament edition details

 
CA-TennisTrophy
Vienna Open